Thomas Aaron Hartt (October 31, 1858 – July 13, 1930) was a farmer, merchant and political figure in New Brunswick, Canada. He represented Charlotte County in the Legislative Assembly of New Brunswick from 1903 to 1911 and Charlotte in the House of Commons of Canada from 1911 to 1921 as a Conservative and then Unionist member.

He was born in Hartt's Mills, New Brunswick, the son of Aaron Hartt and Mary J. Alexander. He was educated at the normal school in Fredericton and at a business college in Saint John. He taught school for a time. In 1881, he married Maud A. Greenlaw. He ran unsuccessfully for a seat in the provincial assembly in 1899. Hartt resigned his seat in the provincial assembly in 1911 to run for a seat in the House of Commons. He did not run for reelection in 1921.

Electoral history

References 
 
Canadian Parliamentary Guide, 1912, EJ Chambers

1858 births
1930 deaths
Canadian schoolteachers
Members of the House of Commons of Canada from New Brunswick
Conservative Party of Canada (1867–1942) MPs
Canadian Baptists
Progressive Conservative Party of New Brunswick MLAs